Pachomius is a genus of jumping spiders that was first described by George and Elizabeth Peckham in 1896. Uspachia was merged into genus Romitia in 2007, and all nine species were merged into Pachomius in 2015. The name is derived from Pachomius, the founder of cenobitic monasticism.

Species
 it contains twenty species, found in South America, Panama, Guatemala, Mexico, and on Trinidad:
Pachomius albipalpis (Taczanowski, 1878) – Peru, Ecuador, Bolivia
Pachomius andinus (Taczanowski, 1878) – Peru
Pachomius bahiensis (Galiano, 1995) – Brazil
Pachomius bilobatus (F. O. Pickard-Cambridge, 1901) – Guatemala, Panama, Venezuela
Pachomius colombianus (Galiano, 1995) – Panama, Colombia
Pachomius dybowskii (Taczanowski, 1871) (type) – Mexico to Ecuador, Brazil
Pachomius flavescens Peckham & Peckham, 1896 – Panama
Pachomius hadzji (Caporiacco, 1955) – Venezuela
Pachomius hieroglyphicus (F. O. Pickard-Cambridge, 1901) – Mexico
Pachomius juquiaensis (Galiano, 1995) – Brazil
Pachomius lehmanni (Strand, 1908) – Colombia
Pachomius ministerialis (C. L. Koch, 1846) – Panama, Colombia, Venezuela
Pachomius misionensis (Galiano, 1995) – Paraguay, Argentina
Pachomius nigrus (Caporiacco, 1947) – Guyana, French Guiana
Pachomius niveoguttatus (F. O. Pickard-Cambridge, 1901) – Panama
Pachomius patellaris (Galiano, 1995) – Bolivia, Brazil
Pachomius peckhamorum Galiano, 1994 – Panama
Pachomius sextus Galiano, 1994 – Venezuela, Brazil, French Guiana
Pachomius similis Peckham & Peckham, 1896 – Trinidad
Pachomius villeta Galiano, 1994 – Colombia, Venezuela

References

External links
 Pachomius at Salticidae: Diagnostic Drawings Library

Salticidae genera
Salticidae
Spiders of North America
Spiders of South America